Gillies is a township in the Canadian province of Ontario, located within the Thunder Bay District.

The township is part of the city of Thunder Bay's Census Metropolitan Area, and includes the communities of Hymers and South Gillies.

Demographics 

See also
List of townships in Ontario

References

External links 

Municipalities in Thunder Bay District
Single-tier municipalities in Ontario
Township municipalities in Ontario